Lake Zakher is a man-made lake in Al Ain, United Arab Emirates. It was created from treated waste water that was released onto land, which pushed up groundwater levels and eventually resulted in the development of a lake.

See also
 Wildlife of the United Arab Emirates

References

Lakes of the United Arab Emirates